The lieutenant governor of Kansas is the second-ranking member of the executive branch of Kansas state government. The lieutenant governor is elected on a ticket with the governor for a four-year term. The lieutenant governor succeeds to the office of governor if the office becomes vacant, and also serves as acting governor if the governor is incapacitated or absent from the state.

Constitutional requirements
The Constitution of Kansas provides that the Lieutenant Governor must satisfy the same constitutional qualifications as the Governor – that is, none.

Powers and duties
The lieutenant governor of Kansas, similar to the vice president of the United States, the main function of the lieutenant governor lies in the executive branch as the immediate successor to the governorship in the event of a vacancy. In case of impeachment, death, failure to qualify or resignation of the governor, the governorship, with its compensation and responsibilities, shall devolve upon the lieutenant governor for the residue of the term. In the event of the governor's absences from the State, or inability to discharge the powers and duties of the office, the lieutenant governor shall become the "acting governor" until the governor returns to the state or the disability is removed.

List of officeholders

References

External links
 Office of the Kansas Lieutenant Governor
 

 
1861 establishments in Kansas
Lists of state lieutenant governors of the United States